Richard Leo "Dick" Dougherty (August 5, 1932 – November 23, 2016) was an ice hockey player.  He led the United States to a silver medal at the 1956 Winter Olympics.  He was inducted into the United States Hockey Hall of Fame in 2003. Dougherty was born in Fort Frances, Ontario, Canada. He attended the University of Minnesota, where he was a brother of Phi Gamma Delta. Dougherty died November 23, 2016, at the age of 84.

Awards and honors

References

External links
 United States Hockey Hall of Fame bio
 

1932 births
2016 deaths
American men's ice hockey forwards
Ice hockey players from Minnesota
Ice hockey players at the 1956 Winter Olympics
Olympic silver medalists for the United States in ice hockey
People from Fort Frances
United States Hockey Hall of Fame inductees
Medalists at the 1956 Winter Olympics
AHCA Division I men's ice hockey All-Americans